Schistura latidens is a species of ray-finned fish, a stone loach, in the genus Schistura. It has been collected on one occasion from a single locality in 1997 from the Xe Banghiang watershed in Laos. It has not been searched for since. It was recorded in strong currents in riffles and rapids over a stony bed.

References

L
Fish described in 2000